The Spear of the Lily Is Aureoled is the debut album by the American progressive death metal band Sculptured.

Track listing
All songs written by Don Anderson.
 "Together with the Seasons" - 5:08
 "Almond Beauty" - 5:50
 "Lit by the Light of Morning" - 6:19
 "Fashioned by Blood & Tears" - 6:18
 "Fulfillment in Tragedy for Cello & Flute" - 1:00
 "Her Silence" - 9:06
 "Our Illuminated Tomb" - 7:25

Personnel

Don Anderson - guitars, vocals
Jason William Walton - bass
Andy Winter - keyboards
David Murray - drums
Thomas Walling - lead vocals

1998 debut albums
Sculptured albums
The End Records albums